Pansey (before January 2011 Pancey) is a commune in the Haute-Marne department in north-eastern France.

See also
Communes of the Haute-Marne department

References 

Communes of Haute-Marne